Pseudacraea acholica is a butterfly in the family Nymphalidae. It is found in Sudan and the Democratic Republic of the Congo.

Subspecies
Pseudacraea acholica acholica (Sudan)
Pseudacraea acholica mayenceae Hecq, 1987 (Democratic Republic of the Congo)

References

Butterflies described in 1932
Limenitidinae